Euphorbia francoisii is a species of plant in the family Euphorbiaceae. It is endemic to Madagascar. Its natural habitats are subtropical or tropical dry forests and subtropical or tropical dry shrubland. It is threatened by habitat loss.
The species is used as ornamental plant and colourful cultivars have been bred, specially by the Thai breeder Mr. Santiporn Sangchai.

References

Endemic flora of Madagascar
Critically endangered plants
francoisii
Taxonomy articles created by Polbot